Shehnaz Pervaiz is a Pakistani actress.  She played Khajista Jahan in Quddusi Sahab Ki Bewah from the first episode. She is also famous for playing Reshma in Joru Ka Ghulam, Shamim in Love In Gulshan-e-Bihar, Rehana in Mitthu Aur Aapa and Zulekha in Jakaria Kulsoom Ki Love Story.

Biography and career
Shehnaz was born in Lahore in 1968 on 5 April. She completed her studies from University of Lahore. She made her acting debut in 1986 on PTV Channel. She was popular for comedic roles in dramas. She was famous for her pairing with Moin Akhtar in drama Such Much on PTV in 1998.

Filmography

Television

Telefilm

Film

Awards and nominations
1995 PTV Award for Best Actress

References

External links

1968 births
Living people
20th-century Pakistani actresses
Pakistani film actresses
21st-century Pakistani actresses
Pakistani television actresses
Punjabi people